Humor Risk is the sixth full-length album by Cass McCombs.  It was released on November 8, 2011, just seven months after the release of McCombs' previous album, Wit's End. In an interview with the Pitchfork website, McCombs said the two albums were made simultaneously. He explained: "Wit's End was started years ago and it slowly made its way to the finish line. Humor Risk was just punched out. They're friends but they're different. Wit's End is like a stew; Humor Risk is the raw food diet."

"Robin Egg Blue" was the first single released, on November 28, 2011.

Track listing 
All songs written by Cass McCombs
 "Love Thine Enemy" – 3:56
 "The Living Word" – 5:44
 "The Same Thing" – 6:13
 "To Every Man His Chimera" – 5:21
 "Robin Egg Blue" – 3:42
 "Mystery Mail" – 7:50
 "Meet Me at the Mannequin Gallery" – 4:28
 "Mariah" – 3:55

Personnel
 Cass McCombs - vocals, electric guitar, acoustic guitar, piano, percussion
 Dan Altaire - drums
 Rob Barbato - bass, vocals
 Will Canzoneri - organ, piano, clavinet, Hammond B3
 Chris Cohen - electric guitar
 Ariel Rechtshaid - synth
 Parker Kindred - drums
 Brad Truax - bass
 Dave Schiffman - percussion 
 John Webster Johns - synths, electric guitars
 Liza Thorn - vocals

References

External links
Cass McCombs (official site)

2011 albums
Domino Recording Company albums
Albums produced by Ariel Rechtshaid
Cass McCombs albums